The South West Main Line (SWML) is a 143-mile (230 km) major railway line between Waterloo station in central London and Weymouth on the south coast of England. A predominantly passenger line, it serves many commuter areas including south western suburbs of London and the conurbations based on Southampton and Bournemouth. It runs through the counties of Surrey, Hampshire and Dorset. It forms the core of the network built by the London and South Western Railway, today mostly operated by South Western Railway. Network Rail refers to it as the South West Main Line.

Operating speeds on much of the line are relatively high, with large stretches cleared for up to  running. Tourist special services to a lesser frequency use the line, such as the Cathedrals Express.

Proposal 

Several companies had proposed building a faster and heavy goods reliable link from London to the South Coast around Southampton, which would have provided not only a route for commodities and passengers but one for munitions and military personnel in the event of war. At the time, Southampton was smaller than the nearby port of Portsmouth, but since Portsmouth's harbour was already well-developed due to naval operations, Southampton was the priority destination for a new railway having wide scope for development.

In 1831, the Southampton, London & Branch Railway and Docks Company (SL&BRDC) was formed, a precursor to the London and South Western Railway. The company planned to build a railway line to Southampton, but were also interested in building a line from halfway down their route towards Bristol via Newbury and Devizes. In that year the Basingstoke Canal company suggested instead that a link be built between their canal, built 1794, and the Itchen Navigation. The suggestion was rejected by those working on the railway plans and the canal company agreed not to oppose the railway.

The chosen route to Southampton was not direct as it adopted a compromise axis about one third of the way down for a westward Bristol line, never built. This axis terminates shortly after the conurbation on the line of Basingstoke, then an agrarian market town. The route therefore missed the towns of Guildford, Farnham and Alton which would have boosted early revenue. The railway was also forced to narrowly bypass the town of Kingston-upon-Thames due to the commercial justification that the railway would damage the town's importance for stagecoaches combined with the cost of boring a tunnel through the town's easterly hill. The city of Winchester north of Southampton was included in the built and in the unbuilt proposal, seeing its station open in 1839.

The Great Western Railway (GWR) secured its patrons for a far more direct route to Bristol, particularly influential landowners in Berkshire and Wiltshire. The GWR received Parliamentary authority and shortly afterwards the Southampton railway. The SL&BRDC held to its chosen route including Basingstoke, though changed its name to the London and Southampton Railway, and later the London and South Western Railway (L&SWR). Throughout the 19th century, the L&SWR and Great Western Railway were often in competition with each other over serving destinations and frequently sought and gained permission to build railways into each other's intended "territory".

Construction 
The first section to be opened was from Nine Elms, the LSWR's first London terminus, in Battersea, to Woking (then named Woking Common) on 21 May 1838.

The remainder of the main line followed over the next two years:
 Woking to Winchfield (Shapley Heath): 24 September 1838
 Winchfield to Basingstoke: 10 June 1839
 Winchester to Southampton: 10 June 1839
 Basingstoke to Winchester: 11 May 1840. This last section was the most difficult on the route with a long initial climb necessitating earthworks to Litchfield Tunnel and on a ten-mile descent to Winchester which lies on the River Itchen.

In 1848 the line was extended from Nine Elms to Waterloo over the Nine Elms to Waterloo Viaduct.

The Southampton and Dorchester Railway 
The Southampton and Dorchester Railway was also formed and built a line from 1845 to 1847 from Southampton to Dorchester. It avoided Bournemouth, then barely a village, and ran via Ringwood and Wimborne Minster before reaching Dorchester. It took a winding route, which followed the easiest-to-construct links rather than linking settlements in a straight line. In particular, due to intervention by the Commissioners of Woods and Forests, the route between Southampton and Ringwood had to take a southward diversion through Brockenhurst, rather than the straight route through Lyndhurst that the company had envisioned. The line also bypassed Poole. Initially, Poole was served by a branch from Hamworthy (initially named Poole Junction) to a station on the opposite side of Holes Bay.

The Ringwood line was nicknamed as 'Castleman's Corkscrew' after Charles Castleman, a major figure in the enterprise. The line was originally planned to continue towards Exeter, but this never came into effect. In 1865 the railway was connected to the GWR line to Weymouth, which now forms the current terminus of the line. 

A branch was built in the 1870s from Broadstone to central Poole that continued eastwards to Bournemouth, a town that was now developing as a seaside resort. From 1886 to 1888, a line was then built from Brockenhurst to Bournemouth. A causeway was also built across Holes Bay to connect Poole to Hamworthy. In time, the straighter route through Bournemouth and Poole superseded the Ringwood line. The Ringwood line was closed by the Beeching Axe.

Rival lines and services 
The L&SWR's biggest rival was the Great Western Railway (GWR) who had originally cut the L&SWR's plans by building the line to Bristol. Both companies built several railways from their own networks into each other's intended territory.

In 1848, the GWR built a branch from Reading to Basingstoke. At first this was a fairly quiet railway with a terminus separate from the L&SWR's mainline station. However, when the rival company adopted standard gauge, a link was constructed between the two lines. This later became used for a freight route from Southampton to the Midlands via Oxford. Following the closure of the Somerset and Dorset Joint Railway, this route became used by long-distance services from Bournemouth to the Midlands.

Another line was built in 1873 southward (Didcot, Newbury and Southampton Railway). Originally, L&SWR ruled out allowing the line to use its own track. However the DN&SR fell into financial difficulties, and negotiations allowed its trains to use the South West Main Line south of Winchester.

GWR also proposed building a line from Reading to Portsmouth via Basingstoke and Alton but L&SWR found a cheaper solution for building the northern stretch from Basingstoke to Alton by using a light railway. The Basingstoke and Alton Light Railway stopped a rival's Portsmouth line from being built at the all-too-common cost of being, for most of its existence, unprofitable - it saw an eight-year resurrection but again became loss-making and closed in 1932 save for goods. In 1955 similarly the southern stretch, the Meon Valley Railway, closed to passengers.

Infrastructure

Track 
Between London Waterloo and Clapham Junction, the line has eight tracks. It runs over the Nine Elms to Waterloo Viaduct for much of its length. It crosses beneath the Chatham Main Line where the Brighton Main Line runs alongside it on the southern side. At Clapham Junction, some of these tracks leave on the Waterloo to Reading Line and the remaining tracks are reduced to four. The Brighton Line, which also has four tracks, separates from it shortly afterwards.

The four tracks initially have a pair of "slow" tracks to the east with the two "fast" tracks on the western side. This arrangement continues to north of Wimbledon where a flyover transfers the northbound slow line across the fast lines, leaving the inner tracks being used for the fast services and the stopping services using the outer tracks. This arrangement continues to Worting Junction, just after Basingstoke. Many stations on this section had island platforms which have since been removed - this is evident with wide gaps between station platforms at stations such as Winchfield. The island platforms survive at New Malden, Esher and Walton-on-Thames, although mothballed and out of use.

The line continues as double-track to Winchester but expands to three tracks through Shawford station with one up platform and fast and slow down platforms. There are four tracks from Shawford to Eastleigh. The line from Romsey via Chandler's Ford trails in just north of Eastleigh which is also the junction for the Fareham line. The line returns to double track until St Denys where the West Coastway Line trails in. At Northam the original route to Southampton Terminus carries on south towards Eastern Docks and the main route curves west to enter a tunnel through to Southampton Central station.

The line remains double-tracked most of the way to Weymouth, but there is a single-track section between Moreton and Dorchester South which constrains capacity.

Electrification 
The 'Surrey section', about half of which has become Greater London, was electrified, as far west as Pirbright Junction (for Alton) using the (750 V DC third rail) system, by the London & South Western Railway or its successor, the Southern Railway before World War II.

The bulk of the line (that is from Pirbright Junction to Bournemouth/Bournemouth Depot) was electrified in 1967. From then until 1988 trains on the Bournemouth to Weymouth section operated a push-pull system. One or two BR Class 438 4-TC units would be propelled from London to Bournemouth by a BR Class 432 4-REP unit, controlled from the leading cab of the former. At Bournemouth, one or both of the Class 438 4-TCs would continue over the unelectrified line to Weymouth hauled by a BR Class 33/1 diesel locomotive. Trains from Weymouth would follow the same procedure in reverse.

Electrification was extended to Weymouth in 1988 and saw the introduction of then new Class 442 Wessex Electric trains. These were withdrawn by February 2007; Class 444 and Class 450 trains are now used.

Services 

The majority of passenger services are currently operated by South Western Railway. CrossCountry operates the Bournemouth – Manchester services travelling on the line between Bournemouth and Basingstoke.

In addition, Great Western Railway and Southern also operate services into Southampton Central, which use a section of South West Main Line to access Southampton.

In particular, the London Waterloo – Weymouth services run on the whole length of South West Main Line, and other intercity services which run on a significant portion of the line include
 London Waterloo – Portsmouth Harbour (via Eastleigh) services branching off at Eastleigh as an indirect service
 London Waterloo – Exeter St Davids / Bristol Temple Meads services branching off at Basingstoke
 London Waterloo – Portsmouth services branching off at Woking
 Bournemouth – Manchester CrossCountry services branching off at Basingstoke for the Reading to Basingstoke Line to Reading

Other services from London Waterloo also run on a section of South West Main Line, except those run on Waterloo–Reading line towards the direction of Richmond.

Future development 
In July 2011, Network Rail in its London & South East Route Utilisation Strategy (RUS) recommended adding a fifth track to the four-track stretch of line between Clapham Junction and Surbiton. This was found to be feasible within the existing land (rail corridor), and was seen as the most practicable way of providing more capacity on the route. It would permit up to eight additional trains to run in the peak hour, for a maximum of 32 trains in this stretch. The scheme would also entail more flexible track use, modifying one Windsor Line track to permit use by mainline trains. Options rejected in the RUS as not viable included double-deck trains, building a flyover at Woking, and introducing 12- or 16-car trains.

See also 
Crossrail 2 (proposed SW-NE cross-London line to relieve congestion)

References

Bibliography

External links 

Basingstoke's Railway History
Network Rail's Route Utilisation Strategy for the South West Main Line

Transport in the London Borough of Lambeth
Transport in the London Borough of Wandsworth
Transport in the London Borough of Merton
Transport in the Royal Borough of Kingston upon Thames
Rail transport in Surrey
Rail transport in Hampshire
Rail transport in Dorset
Railway lines opened in 1840
Railway lines in London
Railway lines in South East England
Railway lines in South West England
Standard gauge railways in England